American singer Madison Beer has released one studio album, one extended play, nineteen singles (including three as a featured artist) and four promotional singles. Her debut studio album, Life Support, was released in February 2021.

Studio albums

Extended plays

Singles

As lead artist

As featured artist

Promotional singles

Other charted songs

Other appearances

References

Notes

Sources

Discographies of American artists
Pop music discographies